West Washington Street Pumping Station is a historic pumping station located at Indianapolis, Indiana. It was built in 1870, and is a one-story, rectangular brick building. It was modified to its present form after 1909, and is 2/3 of its original size. It has a slate hipped roof topped by a square central tower and features distinctive brick detailing, and arched openings. The building served as the city's only water pumping station until 1890.

It was listed on the National Register of Historic Places in 1980. It currently houses the park offices of White River State Park.

History 
In 1870, the Water Works Company of Indianapolis was founded to supply drinking water and pressurized water for fire protection by James O. Woodruff, who later in the 1870s would develop the suburb of Woodruff Place. Construction of the pumping station began that year and it opened in 1871. The station, located on West Washington Street at the Indiana Central Canal, used the canal to power water wheels to pump water into the water system.

The Water Works Company failed to attract enough customers and its assets, including the pumphouse, were sold at a sheriff's sale to the newly-formed Indianapolis Water Company in 1881. The pumphouse was the only one in the system until 1890, when the company opened the Riverside station.

In 1908, the company installed hydraulic turbines connected to three centrifugal pumps to improve efficiency while continuing to use the canal as the power source.

The building originally had three wings forming a T. A tornado in 1930 damaged one wing and it was removed, resulting in the structure's current rectangular form. The building's cupola was also damaged and removed.

The pumphouse continued in use until 1969. In 1976, the water company gave the building and surrounding property to the city of Indianapolis. With development of White River State Park starting, it was decided in 1979 to locate the park offices and visitor center in the pumphouse. The city sold the pumphouse to the White River Park Development Commission in 1980 and renovations, including reconstruction of the cupola, began soon thereafter. On July 9, 1980, the pumphouse was added to the National Register of Historic Places, and on August 31, 1981, the commission moved into its offices there. The visitor center was also opened there, but was later moved to a new building.

References

External links

Water supply pumping stations on the National Register of Historic Places
Industrial buildings and structures on the National Register of Historic Places in Indiana
Buildings and structures completed in 1871
Buildings and structures in Indianapolis
National Register of Historic Places in Indianapolis
1871 establishments in Indiana
White River State Park